Chachar is a tribe found in the Sindh, Punjab, and Balochistan provinces of Pakistan and in the Indian state of Rajasthan.
As per book "New Indian History of Indo Pakistan" by K. Ali, the Mughal Emperor Akber during his reign, distributed western lands of subcontinent into four parts and given them to each notable, respectably, influential and strong tribes for control  of Revenue. One of these four tribes was Chachar Tribe given responsibility of the areas now comprising Southern Punjab, Northern Sindh and Western Baluchistan in Pakistan and Rajhistan in India. 
Chacharan Shareef a sacred historical place near Kanpur Punjab is associated with this tribe.
Agriculturist Chachars own land in the area between Mirpur Mathelo, Ghotki, Pano akil, Guddu Barrage, and Thatta. Chachars in the Sukkur area were involved in a feud with members of the Mahar tribe in the early years of the 21st century.
Other tribes associated with the Chachars include Kakar and Jan tribes found in Mardan, Peshawar etc.
There are many paras (local sub castes) of Chachar Community like Katcha Chachar, Pakka Chachar, Karirra Chachar, Noorani Chachar, Bhanbhani Chachar, Chota Chachar etc.

References

Social groups of Pakistan
Sindhi tribes